Gloria Lund Main (née Lund; born 1933) is an American economic historian who is a professor emeritus of history at University of Colorado Boulder. She authored two books about the Thirteen Colonies.

Life 
Gloria Jean Lund was born to Mr. and Mrs. Howard Lund of Mount Hermon, California. She graduated from Analy High School. Lund completed her bachelor's degree at San Jose State College (now San Jose State University). She was an economics graduate student at University of California, Berkeley where she was the only female graduate student. In 1956, Lund paused her studies to marry her former undergraduate professor, Jackson Turner Main, a grandson of historian Frederick Jackson Turner. After their three children were school aged, she earned a M.A. from Stony Brook University.

Influenced by her husband's field of study, Main completed a Ph.D. in American history at Columbia University. Her 1972 dissertation on personal wealth in the Thirteen Colonies was the basis of her first book. She applies her economics training to her studies of colonial time periods. After a few years of lecturing part time in the New York area, Main joined the faculty at University of Colorado Boulder. , she is a professor emeritus.

Selected works

Books

Articles

References

University of Colorado Boulder faculty
Living people
Historians from California
Columbia Graduate School of Arts and Sciences alumni
20th-century American historians
21st-century American historians
American women historians
Historians of Colonial North America
American economic historians
1933 births
Place of birth missing (living people)
Stony Brook University alumni
20th-century American women writers
University of California, Berkeley alumni
21st-century American women